In ancient Greek religion and Greek mythology Sosipolis was a native god at Elis. His mother was the goddess Eileithyia. There was a sanctuary of him inside the sanctuary of Eileithyia at Olympia, Greece. There was also a shrine dedicated to him on the left of the sanctuary of Tyche in Elis.

Mythology 
According to the legend, which was described by Pausanias, the Arcadians had invaded Elis and the Eleans were ready to fight them. Then among the Eleans appeared a woman with a boy at her breast and said that when she had given birth to the child she had a vision in a dream to offer the child as a champion to the Eleans. The commanders of the Eleans believed her and placed the child naked before their ranks. When the Arcadians began the attack, the child turned into a serpent, seeing that the Arcadians fled in dismay and the Eleans pursued them and were victorious. Because of that the Eleans called the boy Sosipolis (meaning savior of the city) because he was the city's savior, and on the spot where he had transformed into a snake they built a sanctuary to him. At the building they also worshiped the goddess Eileithyia because she was the supposed mother of the boy and she brought her son to help them. The tomb of the Arcadians who were killed in the battle was on the hill across the Cladeus.

Cult 
The sanctuary of Sosipolis was inside the temple of Eileithyia at Olympia. The building had two parts, the front part was public and was dedicated to the Eileithyia, but in the inner part Sosipolis was worshipped and only the priestess who was responsible for the god could enter. Eleans chose an old priestess for the goddess every year. The priestess was also responsible for Sosipolis. She lived in chastity and had to bring water for the god's bath and setting before him barley cakes kneaded with honey. When she entered the part of the Sosipolis, she had to wrap her head and face in a white veil. Maidens and matrons wait in the sanctuary of Eileithyia chanting a hymn; they burned all manner of incense to the god, but it was not the custom to pour libations of wine. Oaths in which he was called upon were very important.

There was also a shrine dedicated to Sosipolis on the left of the sanctuary of Tyche in Elis. The god was painted as a boy, wrapped in a star-spangled robe and in one hand holding the horn of Amaltheia, according to his appearance in a dream.

References

Bibliography 
 Pausanias, Pausanias Description of Greece with an English Translation by W.H.S. Jones, Litt.D., and H.A. Ormerod, M.A., in 4 Volumes. Cambridge, MA, Harvard University Press; London, William Heinemann Ltd. 1918. Online version at the Perseus Digital Library.

External links 
 SOSIPOLIS on The Theoi Project

Greek gods
Shapeshifters in Greek mythology
Snake gods
Savior gods
Elis